This is a complete list of members of the United States House of Representatives during the 63rd United States Congress listed by seniority. For the most part, representatives are ranked by the beginning of their terms in office.

As an historical article, the districts and party affiliations listed reflect those during the 63rd Congress (March 4, 1913–March 3, 1915). Seats and party affiliations on similar lists for other Congresses will be different for certain members.

This article describes the criteria for seniority in the House of Representatives and sets out the list of members by seniority. It is prepared on the basis of the interpretation of seniority applied to the House of Representatives in the current congress. In the absence of information to the contrary, it is presumed that the twenty-first-century practice is identical to the seniority customs used during the 63rd Congress.

Seniority

House seniority
Seniority in the House, for Congressmen with unbroken service, depends on the date on which the members first term began. That date is either the start of the Congress (4 March in odd numbered years, for the era up to and including the 73rd Congress starting in 1933) or the date of a special election during the Congress. Since many members start serving on the same day as others, ranking between them is based on alphabetical order by the last name of the congressman.

Representatives who return to the House, after having previously served, are credited with service equal to one less than the total number of terms they served. When a representative has served a prior term of less than two terms (i.e., prior term minus one equals less than one), he is ranked above all others whose service begins on the same day.

Committee seniority
Until 1910, House committee members and chairmen were selected by the Speaker, who also ranked the members of the committee. Seniority on the committee was just one of the factors that was taken into account in ranking the members. In the 61st Congress, Speaker Cannon (R-IL) had used his power to change committee assignments to demote and punish insurgent Republicans. In March 1910 the Speaker was stripped of his powers over the composition of standing committees.

As a result of the events of 1910, at the start of the 63rd Congress in 1913, the committee assignments were made by each party and then formally approved by the whole House. Each party controlled the committee ranking of its members, but usually this followed the order of seniority of members in terms of service on the committee. It became customary for members of a committee, in the previous congress, to be re-appointed at the start of the next.

A seniority rule was normally used to decide committee chairmen, similar to that which the Senate had usually followed since 1846. The chairman was likely to be the majority member of a committee, with the longest continuous service on it. However, party leadership was typically not associated with seniority.

Out of the group of fifty three standing committee chairmen, at the start of this Congress, Nelson Polsby identified thirty three as the most senior member of the majority on the committee. In the other twenty cases, thirteen senior majority members were compensated for not being chairman of the committee (seven chaired another committee and six received better committee assignments than in the previous Congress). Thus only in seven instances was the seniority custom violated, without obvious compensation for the Congressman passed over.

Committees
This list refers to the standing committees of the House in the 63rd Congress, the year of establishment as a standing committee (adoption of the name used in 1913), the number of members assigned to the committee and the corresponding committee in the current congress. Because of consolidation of committees and changes of jurisdiction, it is not always possible to identify a clear successor panel.

List of representatives by seniority
A numerical rank is assigned to each of the 435 members initially elected to the 63rd Congress. Other members, who joined the House during the Congress, are not assigned a number.

Three representatives-elect were not sworn in; of whom one died before the Congress started, one resigned to become a U.S. Senator and one was too ill to take his seat (before dying during the Congress). The list below includes the Representatives-elect (with names in italics), with the seniority they would have held if they had been able to be sworn in.

Major party designations used in this article are D for Democratic members and R for Republican representatives. Other designations include Ind for Independent and Prog for Progressive.

See also
63rd United States Congress
List of United States congressional districts
List of United States senators in the 63rd Congress by seniority

References

 Cannon's Precedents (U.S. Government Printing Office via GPO Access) 
 Congress at the Crossroads, by George B. Galloway (Thomas Y. Crowell Company 1946)
 United States Congressional Elections 1788-1997, by Michael J. Dubin (McFarland and Company 1998)

External links
House of Representatives list of members of the 63rd Congress

63